Air Havoc Controller is a 1994 video game from Trimark Interactive.

Reception

Computer Gaming World gave the game a score of 3.5 out of 5 stating"Provided you're not training to pass an FAA controller exam, but simply want some high-tension challenges steering some heavy metal through crowded skies, Air Havoc Controller is a game you'll want to play"

References

1994 video games
Trimark Interactive games
Windows games
Windows-only games